Ophichthus megalops is an eel in the family Ophichthidae (worm/snake eels). It was described by Hirotoshi Asano in 1987. It is a marine, temperate water-dwelling eel which is known from Japan, in the northwestern Pacific Ocean.

References

megalops
Fish described in 1987
Taxa named by Hirotoshi Asano